The women's team épée competition at the 2010 Asian Games in Guangzhou was held on 23 November at the Guangda Gymnasium.

Schedule
All times are China Standard Time (UTC+08:00)

Seeding
The teams were seeded taking into account the results achieved by competitors representing each team in the individual event.

Results

Final standing

References
Women's Epée Results

External links
Official website 

Women Épée